Simply Shekhar is an Indian late-night talk show that was hosted by popular comedy-actor Shekhar Suman, on Zee TV. It made its debut on 30 July 2001.

Format
The show follows various different segments, such as stand-up comedy, monologue, & chat with a celebrity guest. In addition, the show also contains a segment in which the host, Shekhar Suman mimics some of the most known politicians from all over the world. Besides, in the last segment of the show, Shekhar often sings to the live band on the show.

Episodes

References

External links
Official Site at In-House Productions

Indian television talk shows
Zee TV original programming
2001 Indian television series debuts